Orchestes testaceus, known generally as the alder flea weevil or alder jumping weevil, is a species of flea weevil in the family Curculionidae.

References

Further reading

External links

 

Curculioninae
Beetles described in 1776
Taxa named by Otto Friedrich Müller